Blanco is an unincorporated community in Mahoning County, in the U.S. state of Ohio.

History
A post office called Blanco was established in 1887, and remained in operation until 1901. Besides the post office, Blanco had a country store.

References

Unincorporated communities in Mahoning County, Ohio
1887 establishments in Ohio
Populated places established in 1887
Unincorporated communities in Ohio